Rafael Ladrón (born 3 October 1952) is a Spanish former cyclist. He competed in the individual road race event at the 1976 Summer Olympics. He also rode in two editions of the Tour de France, four editions of the Vuelta a España, and one edition of the Giro d'Italia.

References

External links
 

1952 births
Living people
Spanish male cyclists
Olympic cyclists of Spain
Cyclists at the 1976 Summer Olympics
Sportspeople from Vitoria-Gasteiz
Cyclists from the Basque Country (autonomous community)